Christopher James Skidmore (born 22 April 1991) is an English former cricketer. 

Skidmore was born at Taunton and was educated at Haygrove School in Bridgwater. He played minor counties cricket for Wiltshire in 2010, making three appearances in the Minor Counties Championship. Skidmore was later selected in the Unicorns squad for the 2013 Yorkshire Bank 40. He made his List A one-day debut during the tournament against Middlesex at Lord's, with Skidmore playing in two further matches against Yorkshire and Leicestershire. In these three matches, he took five wickets with right-arm fast-medium bowling, with best figures of 2 for 33. He played Second XI cricket for Somerset and Gloucestershire in 2014, but was unable to establish himself with either county. Outside of playing Skidmore works as a cricket coach.

References

External links

1991 births
Living people
Sportspeople from Taunton
English cricketers
Wiltshire cricketers
Unicorns cricketers